North Carolina Creek is a stream in Webster County in the Ozarks of southern Missouri. It is a tributary of the James River.

North Carolina Creek, historically called "North Carolina Branch", was named after the state of North Carolina, the native home of a large share of the first settlers.

See also
List of rivers of Missouri

References

Rivers of Webster County, Missouri
Rivers of Missouri